The Accademia di Belle Arti di Lecce is an academy of fine arts located in Lecce, Italy. It was founded in 1960.

References

External links
 

Art schools in Italy
Education in Apulia
Lecce
Educational institutions established in 1960
1960 establishments in Italy